Corneille Akilimali Bufole (August 4, 1992), better known as Cor Akim, is a Congolese singer, songwriter, pianist and worship leader, born in Bukavu, capital of South Kivu Province in eastern Democratic Republic of Congo and based in Nairobi in Kenya.<ref name="lefigaro">"Cor Akim, un rappeur anti-Kabila de 26 ans kidnappé à l'est de la République démocratique du Congo", Le Figaro"', December 9.  Retrieved December 27, 2018.</ref>

 Biography 
Cor Akim was born on August 4, 1992 in Bukavu, South Kivu in the Democratic Republic of Congo. After having accompanied Lokua Kanza on stage during a campaign against sexual violence in February 2014, organized by the global activist movement V-Day, Cor Akim decided to record his first album "Homme de rêve", featured songs like Sorry really and Mwasi in 2016 which revealed him to the public in the both provinces of North and South Kivu.

In 2018, he dropped the song Mon Vote, which is about the 2018 presidential election in the Democratic Republic of Congo. This song is said to be the cause of his abduction during the electoral campaign the night of December 8 to 9, 2018 after a karaoke evening where he was invited. Ever since, Akim relocated to Kenya due to security issues and shifted to gospel music with his first song “Glory” released in July 2019, followed by “Abba” in 2020 and “Mkuu” on August 1st, 2022.

Discography
Album studio
 2016 : The Greatest
 2014 : Hommes de rêves

Singles
 2018 : Mon vote
 2018 : Tu peux compter sur moi
 2017 : Un de plus grands
 2017 : Kiuno chako
 2016 : Mwasi
 2016 : Sorry Really
 2016 : Ma femme
 2016 : Mama
 2016 : Mea culpa
 2016 : Tuijenge Congo
 2016 : Je suis Kivu
 2015 : Chrismas wishes
 2019 : Te rencontrer
 2019 : Et si tu pouvais
 2019 : Glory
 2020 : Abba
 2022 : Mkuu

Collaborations
 2017 : Nipe – Big Denty ft. Cor Akim
 2015 : Umoja Bondeni – Voldie Mapenzi ft. Cor Akim, Kinjaah
 2015 : You and I – Kinjaah ft. Cor Akim

Awards
 2012 : Best male pianist in South Kivu, which earned him his first international appearance in a publication of the RNW (Radio Netherland Worldwide), under his former name, that of Corneille Akim.
 2016 : Kivu Top5: Sorry Really'' Best song in Kivu at the RTNK (Radio TV Ngoma ya Kivu).

References

External links
 Cor Akim on YouTube
 Official Blog of Cor Akim

1992 births
People from South Kivu
People from Bukavu
21st-century Democratic Republic of the Congo male singers
Democratic Republic of the Congo songwriters
Soukous musicians
Democratic Republic of the Congo musicians
Living people
21st-century Democratic Republic of the Congo people